The Trigrad Gorge is a canyon of vertical marble rocks in the Rhodope Mountains. It is in Smolyan Province, one of the southernmost provinces of Bulgaria.

The gorge encloses the course of the Trigradska River, which plunges into the Devil's Throat Cave and  further emerges as a large karst spring. It later flows into the River Buynovska. 

Honour
Trigrad Gap on Livingston Island in the South Shetland Islands, Antarctica, is named after Trigrad settlement and gorge.

Canyons and gorges of Bulgaria
Landforms of Smolyan Province
Rhodope Mountains
Tourist attractions in Smolyan Province